Timothy A. Davis (born September 24, 1955) is an American cannabis rights activist, cyclist, gardener, politician, writer, retired warehouse laborer, and disc jockey. A founding member of the Grassroots Party in 1986, Davis was their candidate for Minnesota Lieutenant Governor in 1994, and United States Senator in 1996 and 2012.

Davis, who helped establish a Saint Louis, Missouri, chapter of the National Organization for the Reform of Marijuana Laws in the 1970s, headed the Minnesota branch of the organization during the 1980s and 1990s.

Davis, a resident of Minneapolis, is state chairperson of the Minnesota Legal Marijuana Now Party.

Early career

Tim Davis began his environmental activism career by taking part in the first Earth Day in April, 1970.

Davis volunteered for the Missouri chapter of NORML beginning in the mid-1970s, for more than ten years, until he moved to Minnesota.

A talented public speaker, Davis worked as a radio disc jockey from 1979 to 1986. Davis interviewed medical marijuana patient Robert Randall, among others, in 1979, on KOEL-FM Radio.

1980s—1990s activism

Radio disc jockey career
After earning a broadcasting degree from Minneapolis Community and Technical College, Davis worked as a disc jockey at WWTC-AM, in Minneapolis, from 1985 to 1986.

Grassroots Party
Davis, a founding member of the Minnesota Grassroots Party, in 1986, had a role in the fight in 1988 to get the Grassroots Party into a booth in the coliseum at the Minnesota State Fair, which was staffed by volunteers during the 1990s. Davis was Grassroots Party chairperson throughout the 1990s, and was the party’s candidate for State Representative (District 59B) in 1990, Minnesota Lieutenant Governor in 1994, and United States Senator in 1996.

Minnesota NORML
Davis led the Minnesota chapter of the National Organization for the Reform of Marijuana Laws for over a decade, from the late 1980s until 2000s.

2000s—2010s activism
In 2002, Davis ran for U.S. Congress from District 5 as the Green Party candidate and received 17,800 votes. His campaign included reducing government military spending in order to raise public education funding, and removing influences corporations have over universities. Davis worked in the campaigns for Ralph Nader in 2000, and 2004.

Davis was the Grassroots candidate for United States Senator in 2012 and received 30,531 votes.

2020s activism
In 2020, Davis became chairperson of the Legal Marijuana Now Party Minnesota chapter. Legal Marijuana Now candidate Adam Weeks, who was on the ballot in Minnesota's 2nd congressional district, died four weeks before the November 3 election, throwing the 2020 election into chaos because a Minnesota state law said that if a major party candidate died during an election campaign, a special election would be held. Federal judges ruled that the election should go ahead, despite state law, so the name of the candidate who was nominated by Legal Marijuana Now Party to replace Weeks, was not on the ballot. Davis stated in a court filing that the ruling would disenfranchise Legal Marijuana Now Party voters, and later encouraged party supporters to cast their votes for the dead candidate, Weeks, in memoriam. Weeks got almost six percent of votes cast, in the three-way race.

Davis told a reporter on Minnesota Public Radio that Legal Marijuana Now Party intended to run candidates for state and federal offices in 2022. Davis entered the Minnesota State Auditor race in 2022 as a Legal Marijuana Now candidate.

Political views
Davis voted Socialist in his first US presidential election, in 1976.

Personal life
High school student council mayor, Davis, graduated from Roosevelt High School, in St. Louis, and Minneapolis Community and Technical College.

Davis, a retired warehouse laborer, worked as a St. Louis radio disc jockey during the 1970s―1980s. He resides in Minneapolis, Minnesota, with his life partner Mary.

Political candidacy
Davis has run as a Grassroots, Green, and Legal Marijuana Now candidate several times for various offices, including:
 Minnesota State Representative, Legislative District 59B, in 1990
 Minnesota Lieutenant Governor in 1994
 United States Senator in 1996, and 2012
 United States Representative from Minnesota's 5th congressional district in 2002
 Minnesota State Auditor in 2022

Writings
Davis has written letters and editorials for several publications, including “US Elects President Who Smoked Marijuana” published in 1993 in The Canvas, the Minnesota Grassroots Party newsletter. During the US presidential election in the spring of 1996, Davis wrote, edited, and produced the last issue of GRP’s The Canvas, Volume V, Number 2, with the front page headline “Medical Cannabis Hero and Presidential Candidate Dennis Peron Comes to MayDay Parade on May 5th.”

References

Further reading
 Kahn, Aron (October 1987). "Marijuana backers keep issue burning / Controversy still alive". Star Tribune.
 Gilyard, Burl (July 5, 1995). "Doobie Brothers: Grassroots Party members grapple with their budding political clout". Twin Cities Reader.
 "Legal Marijuana Now Party Names New 2nd District Candidate Following Death Of Adam Weeks". CBS Minnesota. October 6, 2020.

External links

 Ballotpedia: Tim Davis

1955 births
Living people
American cannabis activists
American DJs
American environmentalists
American political party founders
Cannabis in Minnesota
Grassroots Party politicians
Minnesota Greens
Missouri socialists
People from Minnesota
People from St. Louis County, Missouri
Yippies